The Manila Nomads Sports Club, or simply the Nomads Sports Club or the Manila Nomads, is a sports club based in Carmona, Cavite, Philippines. For much of its history its grounds was situated within Metro Manila with its last ground within the metropolis located at the Merville area in Parañaque from 1969 to 2017.

The sports club is known for its activities in rugby and association football, Its football team played in the now-defunct United Football League, which was the highest level of Philippine club football. In 2011, the Nomads football team won the UFL Division 2 title after being runner-up in 2010.

History
The Manila Nomads Sports Club was founded in 1914 by members of the Manila Club which primarily is a club for Britons and the oldest existing club in the country. James Walker Cairns, who was born in Scotland in 1870 was the first president of the sports club. Cairns served the position from 1914 to 1934. The FIFA Book of Record, lists the football team of Manila Nomads as the first Philippine Football Champion, winning the local league in 1914. The initial site of the club was built near the Manila Club on the corner of Marquins de Comillas and Padre Faura next to the Paco Cemetery. World War II interrupted the activities of the club.

The facilities of the Manila Club were destroyed during the Liberation of Manila. After the war the Nomads used the grounds for their activities and were involved with the rebuilding of the Manila Club which is now occupied by the Philippine Charity Sweepstakes Office. It was proposed for the Manila Club and Manila Nomads to be merged but did not push through with the plan after members decided on the matter during a general meeting of the Manila Club.

On 14 January 1949, the Nomads Sports Club was registered as a non-profit corporation in accordance to Philippine law. In 1949/50, a new ground and clubhouse of the Nomads was constructed in Makati, near the corner of current Pasay Road and EDSA. In the 1960s, the club looked for another location after an offer to sell the property to the club was declined by the Board of Directors of the Nomads.

The sports club moved to Merville in 1969 on a land leased to them by Emilio Nery. The facility was improved upon with the addition of two tennis courts in 1977, a junior Olympic size swimming pool and changing room was added in 1981 as a result of a joint venture with the British School, the first and only lawn bowls green in the Philippines was added in 1988.

After the death of Emilio Nery, his heirs expressed interest to sell the land with Manila Nomads reportedly had the first right to purchase the property. The club has raised funds to purchase the Merville grounds. The land was sold to Multisphere Trading of businessman Kishore Hemlani who legally challenged Nomad's claim on the land and won forcing the club to move out of Merville.

In 2016, the forced closure of the Nomad's grounds was announced. The last rugby match held in the venue was the 2016 SPI 15s league grand final between the Nomads and the Alabang Eagles Rugby Club where the latter won over the former, 24–16. By early 2017, the club has moved to the San Lazaro Leisure Park in Carmona, Cavite.

Football

Men's
The men's football team of the Manila Nomads was the oldest section of the sports club having won the Philippine National Championships in 1924.

United Football League

Manila Nomads was one of the founding members of the United Football League and played in both divisions since the league started as a semi-professional football league in 2009.

After winning the UFL Division 2 title in the 2011 season, the Nomads, along with two other clubs, were promoted to the first division.

In the 2012 season, the club ended the season 7th in the table.
In the 2013 season, the club finished 8th in the table.

However, before the start of the 2014 season, Manila Nomads chose to self-relegate to the second division due to a new 5-foreign player cap rule, being a team that consists mainly of expats. They decided not to participate of the league tournament of the 2015 season to build a roster that would comply with the newly imposed regulation. They participated in the 2015 UFL Cup finishing at the bottom 16 but advanced to the play-offs following Global's disqualification.

They returned to the 2016 season and participated at the 2016 UFL Cup. For the 2016 edition it was mandated that there would be no guest teams at the UFL Cup, and all participants are to enter the league competition.

Home venue
Manila Nomads men's played its home games at Nomads Field in Parañaque, which has a capacity of 3,000 spectators.

Records

Key
Tms. = Number of teams
Pos. = Position in league
TBD  = To be determined
DNQ  = Did not qualify
Note: Performances of the club indicated here was after the UFL created (as a semi-pro league) in 2009.

Honors

Domestic competitions
 UFL Division 2
Winners: 2011
Runner-up: 2010

Philippines Football Championship
Winners: 1914

Women's
The Manila Nomads organizes a women's football team which was known as the Nomads StretchMarks. The "StretchMarks" name was coined from the name of Mark Hartmann, the first coach of the team and the fact that the team composes mostly of mothers. They have participated in at least 15 competitions and has joined the Weekend Football League in 2011.

A women's team organized by the club participated in the 2019 season of the PFF Women's League. The Nomads had also participated in the women's tournament of the 7's Football League.

Cricket
Cricket has been played in the Nomads since the club's inception. The Manila Nomads hosts the only grassed cricket-playing arena in Manila. The Philippines Cricket Association has its official base within the sports club's grounds.

Other sports
Badminton, Rugby union, Tennis, Squash and Lawn Bowls are other sports accommodated by Manila Nomads.

References

External links 

  – solely focuses on the club's rugby activities.
 Manila Nomads F.C. at the United Football League

Football clubs in the Philippines
Association football clubs established in 1914
1914 establishments in the Philippines
Sports teams in Metro Manila
Sports in Cavite
PFF Women's League clubs
Rugby clubs established in 1914